Football is the most popular sport in Malaysia, where the first modern set of rules for the code were established in 1921, which were a major influence on the development of the modern Laws of the Game. The sport of football in the country of Malaysia is run by the Football Association of Malaysia.

In 1997, Malaysia hosted the FIFA U-20 World Cup, but known as FIFA World Youth Championship during that time. In 2007, Malaysia co-hosted the Asian Cup 2007 with three other countries.

History 

Football arrived in Malaysia, (Malaya at that time) with the British. The locals soon picked up the game, and before long it was the country's leading sport. Towards the end of the 19th century, football was one of the central pillars of most sports clubs in Malaya. But it was not structured. Even when the Selangor Amateur Football League took shape in 1905 – which ensured proper administration and organisation – the competition was confined only to clubs in the Kuala Lumpur.

In January 1921, the British Royal Navy battleship  called at Port Swettenham (now Port Klang), Singapore, Malacca, Penang and Port Dickson. During its stay, the crew competed in friendly matches in football, rugby, hockey, sailing, and golf against local clubs.

Three months later, the Chief Secretary of the Federated Malay States government received a letter from Captain H. T. Buller of the H. M. S. Malaya, which offered two cups to be competed for in football and rugby as tokens of their gratitude for the reception they received in Malaya. The cup for football were then known as the Malaya Cup The offer was accepted and various club representatives met to organise the tournament. A Malaya Cup committee was set up and it was decided to run the football competition in northern and southern sections. The first tournament were entrusted to be run  by the Selangor Club. The first ever Malaya Cup match was played on 20 August 1921, with Selangor defeating Penang 5–1 in front of an estimated crowd of 5,000 in Kuala Lumpur. The inaugural tournament were played by six teams and won by Singapore. During 1923, a newspaper described it as “by far the greatest sporting event of the year (in Malaya)”.

Football began to spread rapidly throughout the region following the establishment of the cup although the composition of the teams at the time were mainly based on ethnic background. In British Borneo, football also become the most popular choice of sports in Malay schools.

In 1933, Association football of Malaysia was founded as Football Association of Malaysia (FAM) which managed the local football scene at that time. By 1954, FAM joins FIFA as a member in AFC.

Malaysia FAM Cup was established in 1952 as a secondary knockout competition to the more prestigious Malaya Cup, the competition were held between the state teams including Singapore, Police, Army, and Prisons Department of Malaysia in its early days.

In 1959, the Malaya Cup departed from the traditional one round tournament to a two-round home and away format in three zones, East, South and North. A new trophy was inaugurated in 1967, and since then the competition has been known as the Piala Malaysia.

Starting in 1974, the state teams were barred from entering the FAM Cup competition and only the club sides could enter.

This football league competition involving the representative sides of the state football associations was first held in Malaysia in 1979. When it began, it was intended primarily as a qualifying tournament for the final knock-out stages of the Piala Malaysia. A one-round league competition was introduced in Malaysia in 1979. The top four teams at the end of the league will face off in two semi-finals before the winners made it to the finals. In 1981, the quarter-finals stage were introduced. When the league began, it was intended primarily as a qualifying tournament for the Piala Malaysia. However, it was not until 1982 that a League Cup was introduced to recognise the winners of the preliminary stage as the league champions which then officially started the era of nationwide level amateur football league in Malaysia. Since then, the Piala Malaysia has been held after the conclusion of the league each year, with only the best-performing teams in the league qualifying for the Piala Malaysia.

Over the years, the league competition has gained important stature in its own right. From 1982 until 1988 the league is an amateur status continue its purpose as qualifying round for Piala Malaysia and only in 1989 it is changes to a new format as Malaysian Semi-Pro Football League (Liga Semi-Pro) by FAM as a 'halfway house' towards full professional status.

Initially the only teams allowed to participate in the league were the state FA's sides, teams representing the Armed Forces and the Police, and teams representing the neighbouring countries of Singapore and Brunei (though the Football Association of Singapore pulled out of the Malaysian League after the 1994 season following a dispute with the Football Association of Malaysia over gate receipts, and has not been involved since).

The inaugural season of Liga Semi-Pro consisted of nine teams in Division 1 and eight teams in Division 2 with total of 17 teams participated. The Malaysian Police joined Division 2 in 1990. Games were played on a home and away basis for about four months roughly between the end of April or early May and the end of August or early September. Under the new format, only the top six teams in Division 1 and the Division 2 champions and runners-up will be involved in the Piala Malaysia. Piala Malaysia was played from the quarter-final stage, scheduled for November after the league was finished. The Piala Malaysia quarter-final and semi-final matches will be played on a home and away basis.

In 1992, FAM created another amateur league for local clubs in Malaysia to compete, which is called the Liga Nasional. The league was managed by FAM outside entity, Super Club Sdn. Bhd. Some of the clubs which compete in the league are Hong Chin, Muar FA, PKNK from Kedah, DBKL, PKNS, BSN, LPN, BBMB, Proton, PPC and PKENJ. Unfortunately, the league only ran for one season before it folded. Some of the clubs were then evolved and joined the main league, such as PKENJ, which became JCorp and now as JDT.

With the advent of two-league Liga Semi-Pro in 1989, FAM Cup becomes the third-tier competition. In 1993, the format of the competition was changed to include a two-group league followed by the traditional knockout format. Promotion to the professional Malaysian League were introduced for the first time in 1997, Johor FC and NS Chempaka FC the first two sides to be promoted that year.

Liga Semi-Pro was the nation's top-tier league until it was succeeded by the formation of Malaysian first professional football league, the Liga Perdana in 1994 by Football Association of Malaysia.

In 1998, Liga Perdana was divided into two divisions consist of Liga Perdana 1 and Liga Perdana 2. During this time both of the division was still just referred as Malaysian League as a whole.

During 1998, Liga Perdana 1 consisted of 12 teams while Liga Perdana 2 had 8 teams. 10 teams that previously qualified for Piala Malaysia which played in 1997 Liga Premier were automatically qualified to Liga Perdana 1. The other two spots were filled by a playoff round of the 5 lowest teams in the 1997 Liga Premier and the Malaysian Olympic football team. The lowest four teams from the playoff round were then put into Liga Perdana 2 alongside Police, Malaysia Military, Negeri Sembilan Chempaka F.C and PKN Johor. At this time the league still consisted of semi-pro team where each team was allowed to register 25 players where 12 players must be a professional for Liga Perdana 1 and a minimum of six professional players in Liga Perdana 2.

Both leagues continued until 2003 when Football Association of Malaysia (FAM) decided to privatise the league for 2004 season onwards where Liga Super was formed. Teams in Liga Perdana 1 and Liga Perdana 2 was then was put through a qualification and playoff to be promoted into Liga Super. Teams that failed the qualification was put into now a new second-tier league Liga Premier.

A further changes were made to Malaysia FAM Cup in 2008 where the knockout stages was abolished and double round-robin league format was introduced. The tournament in now known as Malaysia FAM League.

The most significant successes of the national team of Malaysia has come in the regional AFF Suzuki Cup (formerly known as the 'Tiger Cup'), which Malaysia won in 2010 for the first time in history. They beat Indonesia 4–2 on aggregate in the final to capture the country's first major international football title.

Malaysia had many top players, such as the legendary Mokhtar Dahari and Sabah's Hassan Sani and James Wong, which led Malaysia into their golden age during the 1970s until the 1980s. Before Mokhtar, The Malaysian King of Football, Datuk Abdul Ghani Minhat was the most famous and respected footballer in the whole Malaya during the 1950s until the 1960s. Malaysia's 15–1 victory over the Philippines in 1962 is currently the record for the highest win for the national team. In the current generation, Mohd Safee Mohd Sali and Norshahrul Idlan Talaha are considered by Malaysians as their best striker pair.

In the FIFA World Rankings, Malaysia's highest standing was in the first release of the figures, in August 1993, at 75th. Malaysia's main rival on the international stage are their geographical neighbours, Indonesia and Singapore, and past matches between these two teams have produced much drama. Malaysia is one of the most successful teams in Southeast Asia along with Indonesia, Singapore, Thailand and Vietnam, winning the ASEAN Football Championship 2010 and other small competitions while improving at the same time.

League system 

Unlike most of countries that plays football as a main game, the league system in Malaysia still consist of representative from state association, clubs from company, ministry or government agency.

Liga Super 

The Liga Super (Liga Super Malaysia) is a Malaysian professional league for association football. It is at the top flight of the Malaysian football league system and it is managed by the Malaysian Football League (MFL) and partnership of FAM. The league is contested between 12 teams and operates on a system of promotion and relegation with the Liga Premier. The 12 clubs participating in this top flight league need to pass a set of requirements and verification process, particularly related to professionalism and infrastructure feasibility.

Liga Premier 

The Liga Premier is the second-tier football league in Malaysia. It is at the second division in Malaysian football league system and it is also managed by the MFL and partnership of FAM. The league is contested between 12 teams and operates on a system of promotion and relegation with the Malaysia FAM League. The 12 clubs participating in this league need to pass a set of requirements and verification process, particularly related to professionalism and infrastructure feasibility although with lower requirement compared to the Liga Super. The league was named Astro Liga Premier (Astro Liga Premier Malaysia in Malay) in 2013 season and TM Liga Premier before then because of the sponsorship reason.

Malaysia M3 League 

The Malaysia M3 League (formerly Liga FAM and Malaysia FAM Cup) is the third-tier football league in Malaysia. The tournament used to be a cup format, but it changed 2008 as it was held as a league tournament and changing to its current name. Malaysia FAM Cup was established in 1952 as a secondary knockout competition to the more prestigious Malaya Cup, the competition was held between the state teams including Singapore, Police, Army, and Prisons Department of Malaysia in its early days. Starting in 1974, the state teams were barred from entering the competition and only the club sides could enter. In 2018, the Malaysia M3 League was announced as a replacement for the Malaysia FAM League to form the de facto third division of the Malaysian football league system.

 Malaysia M4 League 

The Malaysia M4 League is a fourth tier league in the Malaysian football league system. The league was created in 2018 as part of the Malaysian Football League's plan to reform the Malaysian football league structure. Earlier played under the name of Liga Bolasepak Rakyat, it was an independent football league in Malaysia and not part of the national level football pyramid. However, the winners had been often invited by FAM to compete in the third-tier national level competition. The league was managed by (Liga Bolasepak Rakyat-Limited Liability Partnership (LBR-LLP) and as a mostly amateur-level competition, aiming to create a bigger base at grassroots level.

 Malaysia M5 League 
The Malaysia M5 League is a fifth and lowest tier league in the Malaysian football league system. The league was created in 2018 as part of the Malaysian Football League's plan to reform the Malaysian football league structure.

 Piala Presiden 

The Piala Presiden is the developmental football competition in Malaysia for under-21 players. Since its inception, in 1985, the Piala Presiden has been the major tournament for under-21 and under-23 players. In 2009, the format of the competition was changed with only under-20 players eligible to be fielded for the tournament. In 2015 the format of the competition reverted to the original format with under-21 players and three over age players eligible to play.

 Piala Belia 

The Piala Belia is the developmental football competition in Malaysia for under-19 players. Since its inception, in 2008, the Belia Cup has been the major tournament for under-19. In 2009 to 2011, the competition is combined with Piala Presiden. In 2015 the format of the competition changed to the league format.

 Cup competitions 
There are several cup competitions for clubs at different levels of the football pyramid. The two major cup competitions are the Malaysia FA Cup and the Malaysia Cup.

 Domestic Cup competitions 
 The Malaysia Cup, first held in 1921, is the oldest national cup competition in Asia. Only qualified teams from the top 2 level of the football pyramid will enter.
 The Malaysia Challenge Cup, first held in 2018, is for teams that failed to qualify for the Malaysia Cup from the top 2 level of the football pyramid.
 The Malaysia FA Cup, first held in 1990, is a national cup competition in the world. Teams from all levels of the football pyramid may enter.
 The Piala Sumbangsih (also known as Piala Sultan Haji Ahmad Shah) is a single match Charity Cup played between the Malaysia Cup winners and the Super League champions at the start of a Super league and Premier League season.

 International Cup competitions 
 Pestabola Merdeka – a football tournament held in Malaysia to honour the Independence Day. The competition is Asia`s oldest football tournament which invited football playing nations to compete since 1957.

 Qualification for Asian competitions 
Clubs who do well in either the Super League, Piala FA or League Cup can qualify to compete in various AFC-organised Asian-wide competitions in the following season. The number of Malaysia teams playing in Asian in any one season can range from three to four. Currently, Malaysia is awarded the following places in Asian competitions:

 National teams 

The Malaysia national football team represents Malaysia in international football. Malaysia is one of the national teams to have won the AFF Suzuki Cup and did this in 2010.

 Women's football 

Women's football competitions are also managed by FAM. Malaysia women's football national team represents Malaysia in international women's football.

In local football scene, a woman football competition has been held in Malaysia since 1960. The inaugural season was competed by four teams from Perak, Selangor, Negeri Sembilan and Malacca. A competition trophy has only been introduced in 1961 which has been contributed by Straits Times.

Women Football Association of Malaysia (PBWM) was officially registered in December 1974 where the first president was the Tun Sharifah Rodziah. A proper tournament was officially held in 1976 when PBWM introduced the woman football tournament called the Piala Tun Sharifah Rodziah. A new trophy was contributed by the Tunku Abdul Rahman for the inaugural tournament season. The cup format was following the Piala Malaysia format at that year where a home and away match was introduced for the tournament. A total eight teams compete including Johor, Melaka, Negeri Sembilan, Selangor, Pahang, Perak, Penang and Singapore.

The cup was held for consistent basis until 2004 when it was not held for 11 years and making a comeback in 2015 for the 28 edition. A total of ten teams participated in the revival season of the tournament. The 2015 season was won by MIFA. In 2016, MISC-MIFA defended their championship by winning the cup again for the second times.

 Stadiums 

Some of the major stadium used for various team in Malaysia League listed as follow:
 Bukit Jalil Stadium
 Shah Alam Stadium
 City Stadium (Penang)
 Merdeka Stadium
 Ipoh Stadium
 Hang Tuah Stadium
 Hang Jebat Stadium
 Larkin Stadium
 Sultan Mohammad IV Stadium
 Darul Aman Stadium
 Darul Makmur Stadium
 Sarawak Stadium
 Sultan Mizan Zainal Abidin Stadium
 Tun Abdul Razak Stadium

 Seasons 
The following articles detail the major results and events in each season since 1921, when the first organised competition, the Malaya Cup, was created. Seasons in italics'' are wartime seasons, when official national competition was suspended, although regional football continued.

See also 
 List of Malaysia football champions
 List of football clubs in Malaysia
 Malaysia national football team honours
 Malaysia Premier Futsal League
 Malaysia Premier Futsal League (Women)
 Malaysia national futsal team
 Malaysia women's national futsal team

References